Arthrophaga myriapodina is a fungus in the Entomophthorales that parasitizes the millipedes Apheloria virginiensis corrugata, Boraria infesta, and Nannaria sp. Infected millipedes typically climb to an elevated spot before death.

Taxonomic history
Arthrophaga myriapodina was first collected by Roland Thaxter from North Carolina in 1886 on Boraria infesta, but he did not formally describe or name it. In 1916, A. T. Speare sent Thaxter additional specimens labelled as Entomophthora myriapodina, but the name was never validly published. Kathie T. Hodge, Ann E. Hajek, and Andrii Gryanskyi showed that A. myriapodina is distinct from related taxa including Entomophthora and formally named it as the type of a new genus.

Morphology
Arthrophaga myriapodina forms white to light brown pustules that emerge between the segments of a millipede. Its primary conidia are pear-shaped and contain 8–18 nuclei. They are forcibly discharged. No resting spore stage has been observed.

Ecology
Arthrophaga myriapodina is found in eastern North America from May to October, usually 12 to 24 hours after rain.

References

Entomophthorales